Diego Rafael Di Berardino (born  29 July 1987, in Rio de Janeiro) is a chess International Master. He took part in the Chess World Cup 2011, but was knocked out in the first round by Gata Kamsky.

Chess career
Di Berardino learned to play chess when he was five years old through his father. At the age of nine, his teacher asked his class who knew how to play chess because there was going to be a championship. Di Berardino, then playing chess only as a hobby, subscribed with his teacher and went to his first serious match.

In 2007, at the age of nineteen, Diego obtained his International master title. Diego currently holds one Grandmaster norm. He is at the Top 20 players in Brasil, according to the World Chess Federation ranking.

References

External links

1987 births
Living people
Chess International Masters
Brazilian chess players